Colony 5 is a Swedish futurepop/synthpop/EBM band founded in March 1999. P–O Svensson started the band as a hobby with Magnus Löfdahl. The music style has changed with group membership and their sound became more consistent. They have toured through Europe – Denmark, Russia, Germany, Belgium, Holland, Switzerland, Poland, Norway, Estonia as well as the United States, and Mexico.

On 14 December 2007 Colony 5 released the first single from their then-upcoming full-length album, Buried Again. The "Knives" MCD showed off a harder sound as a first taste of what the album would sound like. Buried Again was released in February 2008 on Memento Materia for Scandinavia, Infacted for Germany and ArtOfFact in the USA.

Members
 P-O Svensson (1999–present)
 Magnus Löfdahl (1999–2001)
 Johan Nilsson (2001–2003)
 Magnus Kalnins (2002–present)

Discography

EPs and singles 
 "Colony 5" (2002)
 "Follow Your Heart" (2002)
 "Black" (2003)
 "Fate" (2004)
 "Plastic World" (2005)
 "Knives" (2007)

Albums 
 Lifeline (2002)
 Structures (2003)
 Colonisation (2004)
 Fixed (2005)
 Buried Again (2008)

References

External links
 
 
 

Musical groups established in 1999
Swedish synthpop groups
Underground, Inc. artists
1999 establishments in Sweden